The Second Menzies ministry (United Australia–Country Coalition) was the 26th ministry of the Government of Australia. It was led by the country's 12th Prime Minister, Robert Menzies. The Second Menzies ministry succeeded the First Menzies ministry, which dissolved on 14 March 1940 after Menzies entered into a formal Coalition with Archie Cameron and his Country Party. The ministry was replaced by the Third Menzies ministry on 28 October 1940 following the 1940 federal election.

Percy Spender, who died in 1985, was the last surviving member of the Second Menzies ministry; Spender was also the last surviving minister of the First Menzies ministry, Third Menzies ministry, Fadden ministry, and the Fourth Menzies ministry. John McEwen was the last surviving Country minister.

Ministry

Notes

Ministries of George VI
Menzies, 02
1940 establishments in Australia
1940 disestablishments in Australia
Robert Menzies
Cabinets established in 1940
Cabinets disestablished in 1940